Steven Montez (born January 14, 1997) is an American football quarterback for the Seattle Sea Dragons of the XFL. He played college football at Colorado and signed with the Washington Football Team as an undrafted free agent in 2020.

Early years
Montez attended Del Valle High School in El Paso, Texas. During his career, he passed for 6,512 passing yards with 86 touchdowns, and 8,149 yards of total offense. He committed to the University of Colorado Boulder to play college football. A three-star recruit, Montez chose Colorado over offers from Air Force, New Mexico State, and UTEP.

College career
After redshirting his first year at Colorado in 2015, Montez played in 10 games and made three starts as a redshirt freshman in 2016. He spent most of the season as the backup to Sefo Liufau, but started three games due to Liufau injuries. Overall he completed 83 of 140 passes for 1,078 yards, nine touchdowns and five interceptions. Montez entered 2017 as the starting quarterback. In 12 starts, he completed 228 of 377 passes for 2,975 yards, 18 touchdowns and nine interceptions. Montez returned as the starter in 2018. He returned again for his senior season in 2019.

Professional career

Washington Football Team
Montez signed with the Washington Football Team as an undrafted free agent following the 2020 NFL Draft. He was waived on September 5, 2020 and signed to the practice squad the next day. Montez was elevated to the active roster on December 19 and December 26 for the team's weeks 15 and 16 games against the Seattle Seahawks and Carolina Panthers, and reverted to the practice squad after each game. He was signed to the active roster prior to the Week 17 game against the Philadelphia Eagles.

Montez was waived by Washington on August 31, 2021.

Detroit Lions
On September 2, 2021, Montez was signed to the Detroit Lions' practice squad. He signed a reserve/future contract with the Lions on January 10, 2022, but was waived on May 11, 2022. He re-signed to the Lions' practice squad on December 22.

Seattle Sea Dragons 
Montez was allocated to the Seattle Sea Dragons of the XFL on November 15, 2022, but re-signed to the Lions' practice squad in December 2022. He re-joined the Sea Dragons after his practice squad contract with the Lions expired.

Personal life
Montez's father, Alfred, played in the NFL with the Oakland Raiders in 1996 and was his quarterback coach at Del Valle. During his time at Colorado, Montez was a member of the Sigma Pi fraternity.

Spring League career statistics

Regular season

References

External links

Colorado Buffaloes bio

1997 births
Living people
Players of American football from El Paso, Texas
Players of American football from Oakland, California
American football quarterbacks
Colorado Buffaloes football players
Detroit Lions players
Washington Football Team players
American sportspeople of Mexican descent
Seattle Sea Dragons players